Tetraopes umbonatus is a species of beetle in the family Cerambycidae. It was described by John Lawrence LeConte in 1852. It is known from Nicaragua and Mexico.

References

Tetraopini
Beetles described in 1852